Arthur Harvey (September 26, 1895 – March 22, 1976) was an American businessman best known as the namesake of the Harvey Park neighborhood of Denver.

Early life and World War I
Harvey was born in Edom, Texas. At age 16 he left school to do manual labor and eventually enlisted in the Fifth Texas Infantry. He worked in the company office until he left for France in 1918 and was transferred to the Second Division of the Regular Army, where he was assigned to the 9th Infantry. Harvey was active from August 5, 1917, until August 18, 1919, receiving battle stars at St. Mihiel, Champagne, and Meuse-Argonne and exiting as a sergeant.

The IRS and oil
After his discharge, Harvey returned to Rusk County and farmed for a year, but the failure of the crop forced him to sell the land. He became a railway postal clerk in 1920. From 1923 to 1926, Harvey worked as chief clerk in San Antonio, Texas, and in 1926 he began working for the Bureau of Internal Revenue Intelligence Unit, handling fraud investigations. In the course of auditing oil business, Harvey became well versed in the then new industry. He invested in a percentage of a 36-acre patch in the East Texas Oil Field. Many of his subsequent prospects failed, but notable successes included patches in the East Long Lake field in Anderson County, Texas, and the Spraberry Trend near Midland, Texas.

World War II
Harvey volunteered for military service in World War II and was commissioned a captain in the Army Air Forces. As an intelligence officer for the 449th Bombardment Group, he served in Italy, France, Yugoslavia, and Romania. He retired as a major.

Post-war life
In 1948 he purchased a 320-acre ranch in Arapahoe County, Colorado, and in 1950 purchased another 160 acres. After several failed ventures including a refrigerated storage business, Harvey was forced to sell most of the land to a private developer. A planned community of 1,662 homes called Harvey Park was created on the land around his remaining two acres. In 1962, Harvey sold his home and returned to Texas. He died on March 22, 1976, and was buried in Fort Logan National Cemetery in Denver, Colorado.

Further reading
 Farmer, Garland R. Realm of Rusk County, Published by The Henderson Times, 1951.  pp. 185–188.
 "Prominent Businessman Of Denver in 1950s Dies." The Denver Post 24 March 1976, late ed.: 32.

References

1895 births
1976 deaths
19th-century American people
20th-century American businesspeople
American company founders
Burials at Fort Logan National Cemetery
Businesspeople from Texas
Internal Revenue Service people
Military personnel from Texas
People from Van Zandt County, Texas
Texas Oil Boom people
United States Army Air Forces officers
United States Army Air Forces personnel of World War II
United States Army personnel of World War I
United States Army soldiers